Wade Allen Miley (born November 13, 1986) is an American professional baseball pitcher for the Milwaukee Brewers of Major League Baseball (MLB). He has previously played in MLB for the Arizona Diamondbacks, Boston Red Sox, Seattle Mariners, Baltimore Orioles, Houston Astros, Cincinnati Reds and Chicago Cubs.

Miley played college baseball at Southeastern Louisiana University and the Diamondbacks selected him in the first round of the 2008 MLB draft. He made his MLB debut with the Diamondbacks in 2011 and was an All-Star in 2012. On May 7, 2021, he threw a no-hitter against the Cleveland Indians.

Early life and career
Miley was born in Hammond, Louisiana, but grew up in Loranger, a town of 6,100 residents and 1,924 households. His father, Wendell, was a mechanic for 18 wheelers. Miley attended Loranger High School and Southeastern Louisiana University, where he played college baseball for the Southeastern Louisiana Lions baseball team. In 2007, he played collegiate summer baseball with the Wareham Gatemen of the Cape Cod Baseball League and was named a league all-star.

Professional career

Arizona Diamondbacks
The Arizona Diamondbacks selected Miley in the first round, 43rd overall, of the 2008 Major League Baseball draft. He made his debut professionally with the Yakima Bears of the Class A-Short Season Northwest League. Miley was called up to the majors for the first time on August 15, 2011, and would finish the season with a 4–2 record in eight games (seven starts).

Miley was named the National League (NL) Rookie of the Month for April 2012, pitching 3–0 with a 1.29 earned-run average (ERA), striking out 15 in 21 innings in two starts. Miley took a no-hitter into the 6th inning against Miami. He was also named a NL All-Star in his rookie season after beginning the 2012 season with a 9–5 record with a 3.04 ERA. Later that season on October 1, 2012, Miley pitched an immaculate inning in a game facing the Colorado Rockies. Miley won 16 games for the Diamondbacks in 29 starts in 2012. He also made 3 relief appearances. He had an ERA of 3.33 in  innings.

Miley lost to Bryce Harper for the National League Rookie of the Year in 2012.

On April 22, 2013, Miley hit his first career home run. Miley took a step back from his strong rookie season, managing just 10 wins despite pitching over 200 innings. In 2014, Miley would pitch to a 4.34 ERA with 183 strikeouts and a win–loss record of 8–12.

Boston Red Sox

On December 12, 2014, the Diamondbacks traded Miley to the Boston Red Sox in exchange for pitchers Rubby De La Rosa and Allen Webster and infielder Raymel Flores. On February 5, 2015, Miley and the Red Sox agreed on a three-year $19.25 million contract extension. On April 21, 2015, Miley won his first game with the Red Sox, throwing  shutout innings versus the Tampa Bay Rays. For the season, Miley pitched to a 4.46 ERA in 32 starts, compiling an 11–11 record.

Seattle Mariners
On December 7, 2015, the Red Sox traded Miley and Jonathan Aro to the Seattle Mariners for Roenis Elías and Carson Smith. Miley struggled during his stint with Seattle, pitching to a 4.98 ERA and a 7–8 record. In his last start for the team, he pitched seven scoreless innings against the Cubs.

Baltimore Orioles
On July 31, 2016, the Mariners traded Miley to the Baltimore Orioles for Ariel Miranda. In August, he made six starts, pitching to a 7.14 ERA in 29 innings and had a 1–3 record. The Orioles went 2–4 in his starts. On September 18, Miley pitched four scoreless innings against the Tampa Bay Rays, before being pulled with a back injury. He returned his next start, taking a shutout into the 9th inning against his former team the Diamondbacks. He ended pitching 8 innings before allowing an RBI double. He struck out a career-high 11 batters in his best start in an Orioles uniform. Overall, Miley finished 2–5 in 11 starts with an ERA of 6.17 for Baltimore. The following season, Miley was tabbed as the #4 starter in the rotation. He endured his worst season of his career, setting career worsts in ERA for a full season (5.61), losses (15), home runs allowed (25) and walks (93). He also pitched in a career low  innings pitched. On July 30, 2017, Miley gave up Adrián Beltré's 3,000th career hit. On November 3, 2017, the Orioles declined Miley's 2018 option.

Milwaukee Brewers
On February 14, 2018, Miley signed a minor league deal with the Milwaukee Brewers. He began the season in the Minors but was called up a couple of weeks later. He pitched in two starts before landing on the 60 day disabled list with an oblique injury. He was activated off the disabled list on July 12, going 5–2 with a 2.57 ERA in 16 starts. He also started Game 3 of the Division Series, along with Games 2, 5 and 6 of the NLCS.
In Game 5 he faced only one hitter before being replaced with a right-handed pitcher. This made Miley only the second starter in postseason history to face a single batter and the first to do so without getting the batter out. By starting Game 6 he became the first pitcher in 88 years to start back-to-back postseason games.

Houston Astros
Miley signed a one-year contract worth $4.5 million with the Houston Astros on February 1, 2019. In 2019 he was 14–6 with a 3.98	ERA in  innings over 33 starts.

Cincinnati Reds
On December 18, 2019, Miley signed a two-year contract, with a club option, worth $15 million with the Cincinnati Reds.

On May 7, 2021, Miley threw the 17th no-hitter in Reds history, striking out eight batters while allowing only two baserunners in the 3–0 win against the Cleveland Indians. It was the fourth no-hitter of the season and the second in three days after John Means of the Baltimore Orioles threw his against the Seattle Mariners. Miley finished the 2021 season with a 12–7 record and 3.37 ERA in 28 starts.

Chicago Cubs
On November 5, 2021, the Reds placed Miley on waivers and he was claimed by the Chicago Cubs.

Milwaukee Brewers (second stint) 
On January 9, 2023, Miley signed with the Milwaukee Brewers on a 1-year $4.5 million dollar deal.

Pitching style
He throws four main pitches with an occasional fifth. The main four are four-seam fastball and two-seam fastballs (ranging from ), a slider, and a changeup to right-handed hitters. The least commonly thrown is a curveball in the mid-upper 70s, mostly against right-handers. His favored off-speed pitch with two strikes is the slider.

Personal life
Miley has been an avid hunter since the age of three. Growing up in Louisiana, Miley was a fan of the Atlanta Braves.  He currently spends his off-season on his ranch near Austin, Texas.

Miley and his wife, Katy, have one child, a son who was born in September 2016.

See also

List of Major League Baseball no-hitters

References

External links

 

1986 births
American members of the Churches of Christ
Arizona Diamondbacks players
Baltimore Orioles players
Baseball players from Louisiana
Biloxi Shuckers players
Boston Red Sox players
Chicago Cubs players
Cincinnati Reds players
Everett AquaSox players
Houston Astros players
Iowa Cubs players
Living people
Major League Baseball pitchers
Milwaukee Brewers players
Mobile BayBears players
National League All-Stars
People from Hammond, Louisiana
Reno Aces players
Seattle Mariners players
South Bend Silver Hawks players
Southeastern Louisiana Lions baseball players
Visalia Rawhide players
Wareham Gatemen players
Yakima Bears players